Arthur Kill Road is a major northeast-southwest artery along the South-West Shore of the New York City borough of Staten Island.

Arthur Kill Road is named for the waterway to its west, the Arthur Kill, which separates Staten Island from Union County and Middlesex County, New Jersey. It was known by other names in the 19th century, including Fresh Kills Road, Shore Road and Riverside Avenue.

Landmarks include the Blazing Star Burial Ground, the Arthur Kill Correctional Facility, the unused LNG tanks east of Chemical Lane, the Kreischer House as well as the Outerbridge Crossing which Arthur Kill Road passes underneath.

Transportation
Arthur Kill Road is served by the S74/S84 local buses. The S54, S55, and S56 local buses use Arthur Kill Road for part of their route, as do the SIM2, SIM4, SIM5, SIM6, SIM8, SIM15, SIM22, SIM23, SIM24 and SIM25 express buses, but the SIM4, SIM5, SIM6, SIM8, and the SIM24 do not make stops along the road.

Major intersections

References

External links
 Blazing Star Burial Ground

Streets in Staten Island